Andrew Armstrong (1786–1863) was an Irish politician.

Andrew Armstrong may also refer to:

Sir Andrew Armstrong, 3rd Baronet (1866–1922) of the Armstrong baronets
Sir Andrew Armstrong, 5th Baronet (1912–1987) of the Armstrong baronets
Sir Andrew Armstrong, 6th Baronet (1907–1997) of the Armstrong baronets
Andrew Armstrong of DPP v Armstrong

See also

Andy Armstrong (disambiguation)